The following are the football (soccer) events of the year 1923 throughout the world.

Events
April 18 – Russian professional sports club, Dynamo Moscow, is founded.
April 28 – The first FA Cup Final to be held at Wembley Stadium,  between Bolton Wanderers F.C. and West Ham United F.C. Known as the White Horse Final due to the memorable image of a policeman on a white horse marshalling the crowds. With an official maximum capacity of 127,000, the attendance was quoted as 126,947 but up to 240,000 people are thought to have squeezed in through the 104 turnstiles by the time the gates were closed, leaving tens of thousands still queuing outside. The White Horse Final has the highest ever unofficial "non-racing" sports attendance in the world, which is very unlikely to be broken in the near future. This claim, however, is disputed, as the Maracana held 199,854 fans during the 1950 World Cup final between Brazil and Uruguay.
June 25 – Association football club FC Rapid București is formed, on the initiative of the Grivița railroad workers (first named CFR București).
August 21 – Mexican Association football Club Necaxa is founded by engineer William H. Frasser.
November 23 – AFC Persis Solo is founded as Vorstenlandsche Voetbal Bond in the Dutch East Indies (modern-day Indonesia).

Winners club national championship
Belgium: Union Saint-Gilloise
Denmark: BK Frem
England: Liverpool F.C.
Germany: Hamburger SV
Greece: Peiraikos Syndesmos
Hungary: MTK Hungária
Iceland: Fram
Italy: Genoa 1893
Kingdom of Serbs, Croats and Slovenes: Građanski Zagreb
 Paraguay: Club Guaraní
Poland: Pogoń Lwów
Scotland: For fuller coverage, see 1922-23 in Scottish football.
Scottish Division One – Rangers
Scottish Division Two – Queens Park
Scottish Cup – Celtic

International tournaments
 1923 British Home Championship (October 21, 1922 – April 14, 1923)

 South American Championship 1923 in Uruguay (October 29, 1923 – December 2, 1923)

Births
 May 1 – Fernando Cabrita, Portuguese international footballer and manager (died 2014)
 May 6 – Josep Seguer, Spanish international footballer and manager (died 2014)
 June 30 – Bill Ellerington, English international footballer (died 2015)
 September 20 – Stefan Bozhkov, Bulgarian international footballer (died 2014)
 October 13 – Faas Wilkes, Dutch international footballer (died 2006)
 December 1 – Ferenc Szusza, Hungarian international footballer (died 2006)
 December 3 – Stjepan Bobek, Yugoslav international footballer (died 2010)
 December 25 – Luis Alamos, Chilean football manager (died 1983)

Deaths

References 

 
Association football by year